The  were a class of Imperial Japanese Navy destroyers in the service before and during World War II. The final two vessels in the class, completed after modifications to the design, are sometimes considered a separate "Ariake class".

Background
The provisions of 1930 London Naval Treaty stipulated that the overall destroyer tonnage for the Imperial Japanese Navy would be capped at 105,500 tons with a maximum permissible tonnage per ship of 1,850 tons. Furthermore, only 16 percent of the overall tonnage could be of this size, with the remainder not exceeding 1,500 tons per vessel. This effectively meant that additional units of the previous  and  destroyers could no longer be built. The Imperial Japanese Navy responded by ordering naval architects to design ships that were lighter by at least 260 tons, and yet mount the same armament. In the end, the new class ended up with one less gun (three turrets with five 127 mm guns instead of six), with a smaller hull and displacement. This armament design was not unprecedented, however, as the two Romanian Navy destroyers Mărăști and Mărășești were fitted with two twin and one single 120 mm guns a few years prior, in 1926.

This stretched contemporary destroyer designs beyond the limits, and resulted in a top-heavy design, with severe stability problems. The weight-control measures used by designers were carried to an extreme, which further contributed to structural weakness. This was a problem shared with other Japanese ship designs of the time, which attempted to place too much armament on too small a displacement hull. This was graphically demonstrated when the torpedo boat  capsized in 1934 during heavy seas (the "Tomozuru Incident") and when a typhoon ripped the bows off two Fubuki-class destroyers (the Fourth Fleet Incident) in 1935.  As a result of these two incidents the Hatsuharu-class vessels had to be rebuilt (the first two completed had to be rebuilt twice) or modified while building to remedy their stability problems.

Design

The Hatsuharu-class destroyers were designed to accompany the Japanese main striking force and to conduct both day and night torpedo attacks against the United States Navy as it advanced across the Pacific Ocean, according to Japan's naval strategic projections. They were to be armed much as the Fubuki class despite displacing only 1400 tons compared to the 1700 tons of the earlier destroyers. Furthermore, their fire control systems were to be more modern than the older systems and suitable for anti-aircraft use. This required the gun turrets to be modified for high-angle fire, which also meant more powerful motors to traverse and elevate the guns more quickly to engage high-speed aircraft. The torpedo launchers were to be given a protective shield to allow for use in heavy weather and to protect against splinter damage. And the Hatsuharu vessels were to be fitted with modern, enclosed command spaces protected against strafing aircraft. These requirements could only be met by adding weight high up on the ship and increased the ship's center of gravity. The only way to adhere to the allotted displacement was to try to reduce the weight of the hull and other equipment below the waterline as much as possible. But this put the ship's designers in a no-win situation as any reduction of weight below the waterline further raised the ship's center of gravity and reduced her stability.

The weight of the hull could generally be reduced by using higher grades of steel that were lighter and thinner for the same strength, reducing dimensions, particularly length, or using advanced construction techniques like welding that saved weight over the conventional riveting. The Japanese used the same high-tensile steel for the Hatsuharu class as they did for the older destroyers and chose not to increase the power of the turbines and boilers to achieve the desired high speed, but lengthened the hull to offset the reduced power of the light-weight machinery. The beam was increased to counter some of the extra top-weight, but the draft was reduced to reduce hull resistance, which also reduced stability by lessening the area of the hull beneath the waterline in comparison to the area above it, which was subject to pressure from the wind.

Extensive weight-saving measures were used during the design and construction of the hull. Electric welding was extensively used to reduce weight although it was at an early stage of development in Japan and was still problematic.

Description
The Hatsuharu-class ships were shorter than their predecessors, at  overall.

The hull of the Hatsuharu-class vessels retained the general configuration of the Fubuki-class destroyers with a long forecastle and a pronounced flare of the forecastle to improve sea-keeping at high speeds by adding buoyancy and reducing the spray and water coming over the deck. A large bridge structure was located at the aft end of the forecastle deck topped by four fire control stations of various types. Lowest, just above the compass bridge, was the torpedo director (Hassha shikisho), with the gunnery fire direction station (Shageki shikisho) next above. The fire director tower (Hōiban shagekito) was third from the bottom and behind it was the  rangefinder. Each of these was protected by  plates of Dücol steel against strafing and shell splinters.

For the first time in a Japanese destroyer, a superfiring turret was fitted forward of the bridge. It was only a single gun Model A turret, to save weight high in the ship, and was mounted on a deckhouse to elevate it above the twin gun Model B Mod 2 (B-gata kai-2) turret mounted on the forecastle deck. The second twin gun turret was mounted at the rear of the ship on the main deck. These turrets were slightly heavier than the earlier Model A and Model B turrets fitted on the Fubuki-class. All turrets were fitted with the  Type 3 gun.

The uptakes of the two forward boiler rooms were trunked together aft of the break in the forecastle into the fore funnel while the rear boiler room exhausted into the smaller rear funnel. Both funnels were inclined to the rear to reduce the amount of smoke that might reach the bridge. A tripod mast was fitted between the bridge and the fore funnel. Between the two funnels was the forward  triple torpedo tube mount fitted on a low platform. Behind it "was a torpedo locker with its mechanical quick reload system (Kiryoku sōtenshiki jihatsu sōten sochi) for the three reserve torpedoes inside." To preserve lateral stability the aft funnel was offset to starboard while the torpedo mount was offset to port. The reload locker was also offset slightly to port and angled inboard to facilitate reloading. The middle torpedo mount was positioned behind the aft funnel on the centerline, but its reload locker was positioned identically to that of the forward mount. Superimposed to starboard and overlapping the middle mount was the rear triple torpedo mount positioned on the rear deckhouse. Immediately behind the mount was its locker positioned on the centerline, but angled slightly to the right so that its mount only had to traverse slightly to align with the locker and begin reloading. This was the first ship in history to be fitted with superimposed torpedo tubes, made necessary by the designer's insistence on fitting nine torpedo tubes despite the Navy's requirement for only six.

A small platform that carried a  rangefinder was mounted above the rear torpedo locker and a  searchlight was mounted on a tower behind the rear funnel. The two license-built Vickers  (pom pom) anti-aircraft guns were mounted on an elevated platform at the front of the rear funnel. Curiously they were another case where the designer exceeded the requirements laid down by the Navy.

Propulsion
The Hatsuharus carried two sets of Kampon geared steam turbines, one for each shaft. Each set consisted one low-pressure and one high-pressure turbine, plus a cruise turbine connected to the high-pressure turbine. The LP and HP turbines were connected to the propeller shaft by a two-pinion reduction gear.

This gave a ratio of 3.6 kg per shaft horsepower for the Hatsuharus compared to the 4.1 kg per shaft horsepower of their predecessors.

A single 100 kW turbo-generator was fitted behind the reduction gears in a separate compartment and two 40 kW diesel generators were located between the propeller shafts.

Armament
The Hatsuharu-class destroyers used the same 50 caliber 12.7 cm gun as the Fubuki class, but all turrets could elevate to 75° to give the main guns a minimal ability to engage aircraft. During the war the single turret was removed on all surviving ships after 1942. The only anti-aircraft guns were two water-cooled, license-built Vickers 40-millimeter guns. These guns were deemed to be too heavy, slow-firing and short-ranged and were replaced by license-built French Hotchkiss  Type 96 anti-aircraft guns in single, double and triple mounts from 1943 for the surviving ships. Exact numbers are not always known, but  was carrying three triple power-driven mounts, including one mounted in lieu of the single 12.7 cm gun turret, one twin power-driven mount fitted on a platform in front of the bridge and two hand-worked single mounts in June 1944. These powered mounts were unsatisfactory because their traverse and elevation speeds were too slow to engage high-speed aircraft and more single mounts were fitted to ships in the last year of the war. For example,  mounted ten single 25 guns when she was lost in July 1945. Four license-built Hotchkiss  Type 93 machine guns were also fitted to Hatsushimo, but these were of limited utility against modern aircraft.

The 61 cm Type 90 torpedo was mounted in triple tube Type 90 Model 2 launchers, derived from the twin tube Type 89 launcher used in the  heavy cruisers. Shields were fitted to both the torpedo mounts and lockers to protect them from the weather and from strafing aircraft. Initially, the shields were made from Duralumin to save weight, but these quickly corroded and had to be replaced. "NiCrMo" steel, taken from the air chambers of obsolete torpedoes,  in thickness, was chosen for the new shields to save weight. The Type 90 Model 2 weighed, including the shield, a total of  excluding the torpedo itself. It was traversed by an electro-hydraulic system and could traverse 360° in twenty-five seconds. If the backup manual system was used the time required increased to two minutes. Each tube could be reloaded in twenty-three seconds using the endless wire and winch provided.

Only eighteen depth charges were initially carried in a rack at the stern, but this increased to thirty-six after the autumn of 1942. Apparently, no sonar or hydrophones were fitted until after the outbreak of the war when the Type 93 sonar and Type 93 hydrophones were mounted. Both of these were inferior to contemporary American and British designs.

Radar
Radar was not installed on the surviving ships of this class until late in the war, possibly as late as 1944. They were given a Type 22 radar on the foremast, a Type 13 on the mainmast and a Type E-27 radar countermeasures device was carried high on the foremast.

Construction
A dozen Hatsuharu-class destroyers were authorized in 1931 as part of the so-called Circle One Program. Three were laid down in Fiscal Year 1931 and the next three in Fiscal Year 1933.

Design modifications

On trials Hatsuharu was found to roll heavily, with a very short period of roll and she heeled at an angle of 38° at high speed when her helm was set to 10°. This demonstrated to the Navy that her metacentric height was too low. The Navy ordered in September 1933 that  bulges be fitted on each side to increase her beam and thus raise the metacentric height. Hatsuharu and Nenohi were modified after completion; Wakaba and Hatsushimo were modified during construction. The bulges were estimated to add  to the trial displacement.

The capsizing of the torpedo boat  in 1934 forced the Navy to re-evaluate the heavy armament of the Hatsuharu and other classes. As a result of the investigations in ship stability after the capsizing of the torpedo boat Tomozuru, all vessels in the Hatsuharu class were modified to improve their stability:

 The after deckhouse and rangefinder were removed and the forward single 12.7 cm gun mounting was relocated to this position, directly ahead of the after twin gun mount; its magazine was converted for use as a fuel tank.
 The No.3 triple torpedo mount and its reload locker were removed.
 The compass bridge was lowered by one level and the anti-strafing armor was removed from the entire bridge structure.
 The bulges were removed and the anchor chain stowage was lowered by one deck.
 An automatic system was fitted which filled part of the fuel tanks with seawater to compensate for the consumption of fuel and resulting rise in the center of gravity and hence loss of stability. When the sea water was added to the fuel tank due to their different specific gravities the seawater sank to the bottom of the tank, while the oil floated on top.

The first two ships of the class — Hatsuharu and Nenohi — had already entered service by the time of the Tomozuru Incident. They were removed from service and modified in the Kure Naval Arsenal. The remaining four members of the class were still under construction and were modified before completion.

Based on the stability issues shown by Hatsuharu during her trials, Ariake and Yūgure had been modified for two balanced rudders placed directly behind the propellers and angled outward 18.5° to reduce the angle of heel when turning. These proved to reduce their speed by one knot and were removed after their trials as superfluous since both ships had been rebuilt to reflect the lessons of the Tomozuru Incident.

Reinforcement of the hull
As a result of these and previous modifications the ships were 23.2% heavier, had lost 33% of their torpedo armament and were  slower compared with their original design values.

Wartime service
All Hatsuharu-class ships were lost during the Pacific War. Four were sunk by aircraft attack, and Nenohi was sunk by the American submarine . Hatsushimo, the last Japanese destroyer lost in the war, struck a mine on 30 July 1945.
All ships in the class took part in the Invasion of the Aleutians.

Notes

References

External links

 CombinedFleet.com: Hatsuharu-class destroyers
 CombinedFleet.com: Hatsuharu history

Destroyer classes
 
World War II destroyers of Japan